The Russell Howard Hour is a British topical comedy news show, which airs on Sky Max (formerly Sky One) and is hosted by Russell Howard where he gives his thoughts and opinions on current topics as well as featuring special guests and other stand-up comedians. The show is in a similar style to his previous show, Russell Howard's Good News, which aired on BBC Three and then BBC Two from 2009 to 2015.

Production
On 28 November 2017, it was announced that the show had been recommissioned for a second series, which began on 8 November 2018. Unlike the first series, the second series does not have a stand-up guest. Instead there is a segment titled "Live Forever" where Howard and another comedian test ways to live longer.

On 24 January 2019, it was announced that the show had been recommissioned for a third and fourth series. In Series 3, there was a segment called "Play Date" (which replaced "Live Forever") which showed Howard spending time with a celebrity.

In Spring 2020, shortly after the end of series 3, the fourth series was revealed to be delayed until early Autumn that year due to the COVID-19 pandemic. As a result, Howard created a spin-off series called "Russell Howard's Home Time", featuring a similar format as the original show, except for a shorter 30-minute episode runtime. The programme was filmed at his home in Bath, Somerset due to social distancing measures, and began on 9 April 2020, running for 9 episodes.

The fourth series of The Russell Howard Hour began on 10 September 2020. Due to the COVID-19 pandemic, the first episode of the series did not have a live audience. From episode two onwards, a live audience returned, albeit split into socially distanced groups.

On 17 December 2020, it was announced that the show had been recommissioned for a fifth and sixth series. 

On 8 September 2022, the first episode of the sixth series was originally going to air, but it got pulled off air following the news of Queen Elizabeth II's death that night. After 2 days of delay, the episode was finally broadcast on Sky Max.

With the closure of Sky One, the original channel for The Russell Howard Hour, it was announced that the series would move to Sky Max.

With the exception of the Home Time spin-off, all episodes of the programme have been recorded at Television Centre in London.

Transmissions

Viewing figures
Episode viewing figures from BARB's Top 10 Programmes until September 2018 and the Four-screen Dashboard for September 2018 onwards.

Series 1

Series 2
In series 2, the stand-up comic segment at the end of each episode was replaced with 'Live Forever.' In the segment, Howard and another comedian try an activity that is purported to improve health. Episode 7 was a Christmas Special.

Series 3
In series 3, the 'Live Forever' segment was replaced with 'Play Date.' In the segment, Howard and another comedian try an activity that they have never done before.

Russell Howard's Home Time
Due to the COVID-19 pandemic, series 4 was delayed until later in the year. This spin-off series filmed from Howard's home in Somerset features chats with celebrity guests, comedians and musical performances using Zoom. During the finale episode, Howard revealed that the regular show would return sometime in September 2020.

Series 4
On 7 May 2020, Howard revealed in his spin-off series finale that the fourth series of The Russell Howard Hour would return in September 2020. However, due to the ongoing pandemic situation, this will be the first series to have no audience and only a skeleton crew, due to social distancing requirements.

Series 5

Series 6

Notes

References

External links
 
 
 

2017 British television series debuts
2010s British satirical television series
2020s British satirical television series
British stand-up comedy television series
English-language television shows
Sky UK original programming